Nana Jashvili  (Russian: Нана Яшвили, Georgian: ნანა იაშვილი) is a well-known Georgian classical violinist of Russian tradition, born in Tbilisi, Georgia. A student and later assistant of Leonid Kogan at the Moscow conservatory, she won several competitions in Georgia and in the Soviet Union. At age 17, she won the Premier Grand Prix at the Long-Thibaud-Crespin competition in Paris, where she was also awarded the Prix Spécial for her interpretation of Maurice Ravel's Tzigane. She also won the Concours Musical International de Montréal. She has performed in Russia, Georgia, Europe, Japan and Canada. She has appeared as soloist at the Concertgebouw Amsterdam, the Gewandhausorchester Leipzig, the Staatskapelle Dresden, the Orchestre de Paris, the Moscow Philharmonic Orchestra and the Saint Petersburg Philharmonic Orchestra, with conductors including Claudio Abbado, Karl Böhm, Aleksandr Dmitriyev, Valery Gergiev, Neeme Järvi, Kirill Kondrashin, Kurt Masur and Yehudi Menuhin.

Jashvili is a guest artist at the summer festivals of Bregenz, Copenhagen and Vienna. She is a professor at the Folkwang Hochschule in Essen. Nana Jashvili plays a Nicolo Gagliano violin.

References

External links
 Article in MusicWorld

Long-Thibaud-Crespin Competition prize-winners
Russian violinists
Living people
Year of birth missing (living people)